Coalition against Communalism (CAC) is a San Francisco Bay area organization formed in 1992 in the wake of the Babri Masjid demolition in Ayodhya, according to its website.

Nothing is known about its leadership, its membership or the sources of funding. This information has never been revealed outside of CAC. The group's website is donated by EKTA, a Berkeley, California-based organization. It has also worked closely with the Friends of South Asia.

It has in the past supported donations to the St. Xavier's Social Service Society, Ahmedabad.

In Kashmir, CAC opposes "widespread abuses of human rights in the State of Jammu and Kashmir by the State or Central government" as well as "the continuing violence in Jammu & Kashmir, especially the targeting of innocent civilians for political ends, perpetrated by terrorists".

See also
Indian American
Californian Hindu textbook controversy
Communalism (South Asia)

External links
Coalition Against Communalism
EKTA

See also
Indian American
Anti-Hinduism

Asian-American culture in San Francisco
Indian-American culture in California
Organizations established in 1992
Propaganda in India
South Asian American organizations